Cellino San Marco Solar Park is a 42.692 MW solar photovoltaic (PV) plant in Southern Italy, near Cellino San Marco using 600,000 First Solar modules.

See also 

 List of photovoltaic power stations
 Montalto di Castro Photovoltaic Power Station
 Solar power in Italy

References 

Photovoltaic power stations in Italy
Cellino San Marco